Round Harbour may refer to:
 Round Harbour 2, Newfoundland and Labrador
 Round Harbour, Baie Verte, Newfoundland and Labrador
 Round Harbour, Bonavista, Newfoundland and Labrador
 Round Harbour, Fogo, Newfoundland and Labrador
 Round Harbour, Fortune Bay, Newfoundland and Labrador

See also
 Harbour Round, Newfoundland and Labrador